Andrew James Edward Hibbert (born 17 December 1974) is a former English cricketer.  Hibbert was a right-handed batsman who bowled right-arm medium pace.  He was born in Harold Wood, London.

Hibbert made his first-class debut for Essex against Cambridge University in the 1995 season.  From 1995 to 1998, he represented the county in 7 first-class matches, the last of which came against Hampshire.  In his 7 first-class matches, he scored 236 runs at a batting average of 21.45, with a single half century high score of 85.  In the field he took 5 catches.  With the ball he took 3 wickets at a bowling average of 16.33, with best figures of 3/16.

It was for Essex that he made his debut in List A cricket, which came against Leicestershire in the 1996 AXA Equity League.  From 1996 to 1998, he represented the county in 8 List A matches, the last of which came against the touring South Africans.

Hibbert later played List A cricket for the Essex Cricket Board, making his debut against Ireland in the 1999 NatWest Trophy.  From 1999 to 2001, he represented the Board in 4 List A matches, the last of which came against Suffolk in the 2001 Cheltenham & Gloucester Trophy.  In his career total of 12 List A matches, he scored 170 runs at an average of 17.00, with a single half century high score of 59.  In the field he took 3 catches.

References

External links
Andrew Hibbert at Cricinfo
Andrew Hibbert at CricketArchive

1974 births
Living people
People from Harold Wood
Cricketers from Greater London
English cricketers
Essex cricketers
Essex Cricket Board cricketers